Credit Union 1 Arena (previously known as UIC Pavilion) is a multi-purpose arena located at 525 S. Racine Avenue on the Near West Side in Chicago, Illinois. It opened in 1982.

Description and history
Credit Union 1 Arena is located on the campus of the University of Illinois at Chicago. Originally named the UIC Pavilion, it opened in 1982, and was renovated in 2001. The arena is rented for many functions and concerts. It is accessible from the CTA Blue Line Racine stop, located one block north of the Pavilion. It is also accessible from the #7 Harrison Bus and the #60 Blue Island/26th Bus.  It also hosted UIC's ice hockey team when they competed in the CCHA as well as the 1984, 1999, and 2000 Horizon League men's basketball conference tournament.

Credit Union 1 Arena is home to the University of Illinois at Chicago Flames basketball team and the former home of the Chicago Sky WNBA team. It is the home of the Chicago Smash of World TeamTennis and Windy City Rollers of the Women's Flat Track Derby Association. From 2004 to 2006 it also housed the Chicago Storm Major Indoor Soccer League team before they moved into the newly constructed Sears Centre.
The UIC Pavilion was the home arena for Jim Crockett Promotions and WCW Wrestling in the late 1980s and early 1990s. It was the site of three PPV events: Starrcade 87, Chi-Town Rumble  and Halloween Havoc 90.
When used as a concert venue the arena seats up to 10,075 for end-stage shows, 7,924 for -house shows, and 5,878 for -house shows. The venue continues to be a regular host for major rock concerts, including notable sets from Green Day to Phish.

In 2016, it was the home the Chicago Eagles of Champions Indoor Football. However, the team went on hiatus for the 2017 season.

In 2018, UIC signed a 15-year naming rights agreement with Credit Union 1, a credit union based in Illinois, and renamed the venue from UIC Pavilion to Credit Union 1 Arena.

Notable events

1980s
 Prince performed the final show of his 1999 Tour here on April 10, 1983.
 Black Sabbath performed here on November 18, 1983 on their completely sold-out Born Again Tour featuring Deep Purple's Ian Gillan on vocals.
 Bon Jovi performed here on March 4, 1987. Parts of the footage were used in the Wanted Dead or Alive video clip.
 The Grateful Dead performed here April 9, 10, and 11, 1987.
Madonna performed there as part of her first tour ever, Virgin Tour, in 1985.
Deep Purple performed here on February 16, 17, 1985 on their sold out Perfect Strangers tour
Starrcade 87: Chi-Town Heat took place November 26, 1987
Run-DMC performed as part of Run's House Tour on July 29, 1988, opening acts were Public Enemy and D.J. Jazzy Jeff & The Fresh Prince
Metallica performed there on November 17, 1988 as part of the Damaged Justice tour promoting their fourth album, ...And Justice for All. 
Chi-Town Rumble took place February 20, 1989
Eazy E and N.W.A. performed at the arena on June 14, 1989 as part of their Eazy Duz It Tour. Opening acts included Kid N' Play, J.J. Fad, Kwamé, and Too Short.
The Fire Meets the Fury Tour Stevie Ray Vaughan and Jeff Beck took place October 28, 1989

1990s
Halloween Havoc 90 took place October 27, 1990
Ice Cube and Too $hort headlined a concert as part of their Straight From the Underground Tour on November 25, 1990, opening acts included Poor Righteous Teachers, D-Nice, Yo-Yo and Kid Rock.
 Phish performed here on June 18 and November 25, 1994. Both concerts would be released in full on the band's 2012 box set Chicago '94.
The World Air Games, a high jump competition, was held at the UIC Pavilion February 16, 1996.

2000s
Members of the US National men's and women's gymnastics shows participated at an event at the UIC Pavilion in early October 2003.
On November 24, 2006 comedy rock duo Tenacious D performed as part of their Pick of Destiny Tour, Neil Hamburger opened for them
The UIC Pavilion hosted the AIBA 2007 World Amateur Boxing Championships, which was the largest AIBA World Championships in its history. It took place October 23- November 3, 2007.
WEC 40 took place at the Pavilion on April 25, 2009.

2010s

November 5–7, 2010 the UIC Pavilion hosted the 2010 WFTDA Championships series, which was dubbed the Uproar on the Lakeshore.
July 24, 2011 the UIC Pavilion hosted the 2010 CoverGirl Classic USA Gymnastics event
July 23, 2011 the UIC Pavilion hosted the 2011 CoverGirl Classic USA Gymnastics event
May 23 and 24, 2012 the UIC Pavilion hosted the first two days of the World Summit of Nobel Peace Laureates. The third day was held at Symphony Center. The event was held in Chicago simultaneous to the 2012 Chicago Summit.
May 26, 2012 the UIC Pavilion hosted the Secret U.S. Classic USA Gymnastics event.
Sept 17, 2015, the WNBA Chicago Sky defeated the Indiana Fever 77–72 at the UIC Pavilion before a crowd of 4,098 in game 1 of an Eastern Conference Semifinal series of the 2015 WNBA Playoffs.
March 11, 2016: Donald Trump canceled his scheduled political rally at the UIC Pavilion. Unrest between Trump supporters and protesters followed.
Feb 16, 2018, Glory 50: Chicago kickboxing event was held at the UIC Pavilion.
Feb 28, 2018, rock band A Day to Remember performed to a sold-out crowd on their '15 Years in the Making' tour, which was also the biggest headlining the crowd the band had played for to date. 
In April 2018, the UIC Pavilion hosted the NCAA Men's Gymnastics Championships.

See also
 List of NCAA Division I basketball arenas

References

External links
Credit Union 1 Arena

Buildings and structures in Chicago
Indoor arenas in Chicago
College basketball venues in the United States
Indoor ice hockey venues in Chicago
Indoor soccer venues in Illinois
Chicago Sky venues
UIC Flames basketball
UIC Flames men's ice hockey
Basketball venues in Chicago
Boxing venues in Chicago
Gymnastics venues in Chicago
Mixed martial arts venues in Illinois
Soccer venues in Chicago
Wrestling venues in Chicago
Music venues in Chicago
University of Illinois Chicago
Continental Basketball Association venues
Chicago Cheetahs